The Dialogue Party is a political party in Argentina founded in 2015 by Emilio Monzó, as a split from Republican Proposal (PRO). The party now forms part of the Juntos por el Cambio coalition, alongside PRO. It is presently a provincial party, as it is only registered in Buenos Aires Province.

The party currently counts with minor representation in the Argentine Chamber of Deputies, as Monzó was elected as a representative in the 2021 legislative election.

References

Political parties established in 2015
2015 establishments in Argentina
Peronist parties and alliances in Argentina